This list of fossil arthropods described in 2015 is a list of new taxa of trilobites, fossil insects, crustaceans, arachnids and other fossil arthropods of every kind that have been described during the year 2015. The list only includes taxa at the level of genus or species.

Newly named arachnids

Newly named crustaceans

Malacostracans

Ostracods

Other crustaceans

Insects

Trilobites

Other arthropods

References

Arthropod paleontology
Lists of arthropods
2015 in paleontology